NGC 446 is a lenticular galaxy of type (R)SAB0^0 located in the constellation Pisces. It was first discovered on October 23, 1864 by Albert Marth (and later listed as NGC 446); it was also seen on August 20, 1892 by Stéphane Javelle (and later listed as IC 89). It was described by Dreyer as "faint, very small, stellar."

References

External links
 

0446
18641023
Pisces (constellation)
Lenticular galaxies
004578